Blue Lightnin' is an album by blues musician Lightnin' Hopkins recorded in Texas in 1965 and released on Stan Lewis' Jewel Records label in 1967.

Reception

AllMusic reviewer Bill Dahl stated: "After a slew of albums aimed primarily at the folk-blues audience that resuscitated his flagging career during the early '60s, Lightnin' Hopkins attempted to regain his original fan base with these unpretentious 1965 sessions for Stan Lewis' Jewel logo. Pretty convincingly, too,".

Track listing
All compositions credited to Sam "Lightnin'" Hopkins and Stan Lewis except where noted
 "Found My Baby Crying" – 3:55
 "Move on Out, Part One" – 2:59
 "Back Door Friend" – 3:56
 "Fishing Clothes" – 3:37
 "Morning Blues" – 4:36
 "Gambler's Blues" – 3:58
 "Wig Wearing Woman" – 3:42
 "Lonesome Dog Blues" (Hopkins) – 2:38
 "Last Affair" (Hopkins) – 2:56
 "Move on Out, Part Two" – 3:00

Personnel

Performance
Lightnin' Hopkins – guitar, vocals

Production
Stan Lewis – producer

References

Lightnin' Hopkins albums
1967 albums
Jewel Records (Shreveport record label) albums